Sankt Ulrich am Pillersee is a municipality in the Kitzbühel district, in midwestern Austria, and is located  northeast of Kitzbühel as well as  west of Sankt Johann in Tirol.

History
The name "St. Ulrich am Pillersee" comes from the patron saint of the church. "Pillersee" is derived from Old German pujen, pillen = brüllen ("roar"), and the German word See ("lake").

Population

Climate 
As Peter Dör-fler, the vicar of St. Ulrich, wrote in 1834: "Der See läßt im Winter bei großer Kält' unter dem Eis ein gewaltiges Pillen hören.." ("When it is very cold in winter, the lake makes great roaring noises below the ice.").

Coat of arms 
The golden cross of St. Ulrich on the locality's coat of arms refers to Ulrich, bishop of Augsburg, honoured as a fighter against the "heathen hordes". He died in 973.

Panorama

References

External links 

 www.st.ulrich.tirol.gv.at - town website
 Pillerseetal Gigapixel Panorama (11,000 Megapixel)

Cities and towns in Kitzbühel District